Jihovýchod (Southeast) is a statistical area of the Nomenclature of Territorial Units for Statistics, level NUTS 2. It comprises Vysočina Region and South Moravian Region.

It covers an area of 13 990 km2 and has 1,684,500 inhabitants (population density 117 inhabitants/km2).

Economy 
The Gross domestic product (GDP) of the region was 30.5 billion € in 2018, accounting for 14.7% of Czech economic output. GDP per capita adjusted for purchasing power was 25,300 € or 84% of the EU27 average in the same year. The GDP per employee was also 77% of the EU average.

See also
NUTS of the Czech Republic

References

NUTS 2 statistical regions of the European Union
Subdivisions of the Czech Republic